Grundy or Grundey may refer to:

Places

United States
 Grundy, Virginia, a town
 Grundy Center, Iowa, a city 
 Grundy County, Missouri
 Grundy County, Illinois
 Grundy County, Iowa
 Grundy County, Tennessee

Elsewhere
 Grundy Mountain, New South Wales, Australia
 Grundy Lake, Ontario, Canada, in Grundy Lake Provincial Park

Fictional characters
 Miss Grundy, a teacher in the Archie Comics series
 Mrs Grundy, in Thomas Morton's 1798 play Speed the Plough, later used to exemplify a conventional or priggish person
 Grundy, a chicken-like enemy in the video game Stinkoman 20X6
 A family in The Archers, a radio soap opera
 "Solomon Grundy" (nursery rhyme), an English nursery rhyme
 Solomon Grundy (comics), a DC Comics supervillain

Companies
 Reg Grundy Organisation, an Australian television production company, later the Grundy Organisation, then Grundy Television and known informally as Grundy's
 Grundy UFA, original name of UFA Serial Drama, a German television production company
 Grundy Art Gallery, Blackpool, Lancashire, England
 Grundy Business Systems Ltd, retailer of the Grundy NewBrain microcomputer

People
 Grundy (surname)

Other uses
 , a World War II attack transport
 Grundy Senior High School, Grundy, Virginia
 Grundy (horse) (1972-1992), a British Thoroughbred racehorse

See also
Solomon Grundy (disambiguation)
Grundy number, the maximum number of colors obtainable by a greedy graph coloring algorithm
Nimber, a type of value used in combinatorial game theory, also called a Grundy number
Grundy value, the number associated with a particular game position
Gruny (disambiguation)
Gundy (disambiguation)